Allan George Scheer (October 27, 1888 – May 6, 1959) was a professional baseball player who played outfielder in the major leagues from 1913 to 1915.

In 281 games over three major league seasons, Scheer posted a .281 batting average (262-for-931) with 141 runs, 48 doubles, 20 triples, 5 home runs, 105 RBIs, 41 stolen bases, 116 bases on balls, .368 on-base percentage and .392 slugging percentage. He finished his career with a .954 fielding percentage playing at left and right field and several games at second base and shortstop.

External links

1888 births
1959 deaths
Major League Baseball outfielders
Baseball players from Ohio
Brooklyn Superbas players
Newark Peppers players
Indianapolis Hoosiers players
People from Groveport, Ohio
Youngstown Steelmen players
Providence Grays (minor league) players
Toledo Iron Men players